Armin Mair (born 5 August 1977) is an Italian luger who competed from 1997 to 2005. A natural track luger, he won five medals at the FIL World Luge Natural Track Championships, including two golds (Men's doubles: 2000, Mixed team: 2003), two silvers (Men's doubles: 2001, 2005), and one bronze (2005).

Mair also earned a bronze medal in the men's doubles event at the 1999 FIL European Luge Natural Track Championships in Szczyrk, Poland.

References
 FIL-Luge profile 
 Natural track European Championships results 1970–2006.
 Natural track World Championships results: 1979–2007

External links
 

1977 births
Italian lugers
Italian male lugers
Living people
People from Lana, South Tyrol
Sportspeople from Südtirol